The Riverpoint Royals was a team in the New England Collegiate Baseball League from 1996 to 2004.  The team was known as the Rhode Island Reds from 1996 to 1999 before going on hiatus for the 2000 season and returning the following year.

Postseason appearances

 *The NECBL did not separate into divisions until 2001.

New England Collegiate Baseball League teams
Defunct baseball teams in Rhode Island
Baseball teams disestablished in 2004
Baseball teams established in 1996